The 1987 Tendring District Council election took place on 7 May 1987 to elect members of Tendring District Council in England. This was the same day as other local elections held across the United Kingdom.

Summary

Election result

|}

Ward results

Alresford, Thorrington and Frating

Ardleigh

Beaumont and Thorpe

Bockings Elm

Bradfield, Wrabness and Wix

Brightlingsea East

Brightlingsea West

Elmstead

Frinton

Golf Green

Great and Little Oakley

Great Bentley

Great Bromley, Little Bromley Etc.

Harwich East

Harwich East Central

Harwich West

Harwich West Central

Haven

Holland and Kirby

Lawford and Manningtree

Little Clacton

Mistley

Ramsey and Parkeston

Rush Green

Southcliff

St. Bartholomews

St. James

St. John's

St. Mary's

St. Osyth and Point Clear

Tendring and Weeley

Walton

References

Tendring District Council elections
1987 English local elections
1980s in Essex